Malus Island is an island  south of Cape Evensen, lying in Auvert Bay off the northwest coast of Stresher Peninsula, in Graham Land, Antarctica. It was charted by the British Graham Land Expedition under John Rymill, 1934–37, and was named by the UK Antarctic Place-Names Committee in 1960 for French physicist Étienne-Louis Malus, who discovered the polarization of light by reflection, a fact subsequently used in the design of snow goggles.

See also 
 List of Antarctic and sub-Antarctic islands

References

Islands of Graham Land
Loubet Coast